Marcus Brown (born 1974) is an American retired basketball player.

Marcus Brown may also refer to:

Marcus Brown (cornerback, born 1986), American football cornerback
Marcus Brown (cornerback, born 1987), American football cornerback

See also
Marcus Browne (born 1990), American boxer
Marcus Browne (footballer) (born 1997), British footballer
Marc Brown (disambiguation)